Charles Dale (born 4 February 1963) is a Welsh actor known for playing Big Mac in Casualty, Dennis Stringer in Coronation Street, Gary "Chef" Alcock in The Lakes and Clive Eustace in The Eustace Bros.  He was born in Tenby, Pembrokeshire, Wales.

Television
From November 2007 until June 2016, Dale portrayed Big Mac, a hospital porter, an Emergency Care Assistant and a Healthcare Assistant in the BBC One series Casualty.

He played Steve Lewis in the BBC Wales series Belonging (1999-2009).

He has also made appearances in Lovejoy, Soldier Soldier, Bramwell, A Touch of Frost, Touching Evil III, The Bill, At Home with the Braithwaites, Burnside, Steel River Blues, New Tricks, Where the Heart Is, Holby City, Spaced, Rocket Man, The Pembrokeshire Murders and Unforgotten.

Theatre
In 2017, he played Hugo in the new musical Everybody's Talking About Jamie at the Crucible Theatre in Sheffield.

References

External links

1963 births
Living people
Welsh male soap opera actors
Welsh male stage actors
Welsh male television actors
People from Tenby